Bill Briggs (William Morse Briggs) born on December 21, 1931, in Augusta, Maine, is notable as the first to ski the Grand Teton on June 15, 1971, and as a result is said to be the "father of extreme skiing" in North America. He is the director of the Great American Ski School, formerly located at Snow King Mountain in Jackson, Wyoming in the United States.

First Descent of the Grand Teton 
His route required a free-hanging rappel down a 165-foot (50 m) cliff face, which he completed with his skis on. Realizing, the next day, that his story would be doubted, he convinced Virginia Huidekoper to fly over the still-visible ski tracks with a photographer on board and document his feat from a Cesna 182. The photograph of Briggs graceful ski turns winding down the face of such a famously steep and treacherous mountain sparked widespread interest in extreme skiing. That interest, which in many ways was born in Jackson, WY, has grown into a significant industry of extreme backcountry and heliskiing such as the World Extreme Skiing Championships, the World Heli Championships, hundreds of feature films, magazines, specialty equipment manufacturers and a global fan base.

Additional Skiing Records & Awards 
Bill Briggs also made first descents of other mountains in the Teton Range, including Middle Teton, South Teton, Mount Moran, and Mount Owen. He was the recipient of the 2003 Utah Ski archives Historical Achievement Award for his contributions to skiing. The International Skiing History Association awarded Briggs with a 2006 Lifetime Achievement Award in Ski Song for his six-decade career as a musician.

In 2008, Bill Briggs was inducted into the U.S. National Ski and Snowboard Hall of Fame, with his citation reading in part: Bill Briggs is regarded as the father of big mountain skiing in the United States. He was able to imagine and believe it possible to ski in places where no one else had skied before. His first ski descent of Wyoming’s Grand Teton on June 15, 1971 is regarded by most as the single crystallizing moment in American big mountain skiing. He also completed the first high ski traverse in the Canadian Rockies and the first modern ski descent of Mount Rainier.

Personal life 
Briggs attended Dartmouth College in 1953 but eventually dropped out. While at Dartmouth, he discovered his love for skiing and mountaineering as a member of Dartmouth's Outing Club, and his love for music, including interest in yodeling and string instruments. Briggs is a founding member of the Stagecoach Band, which has played country and bluegrass music every Sunday since 1969 at the Stagecoach Bar in Wilson, Wyoming.  He also founded and presides over the Hootenanny, an open mic music event that happens every Monday in Moose, Wyoming.  He plays banjo, auto-harp and six and twelve-string guitars. Briggs sings traditional and contemporary folk songs, specializing in mountain yodels.

References 

Extreme skiers
Living people
1931 births
American male ski mountaineers